No. 3 (Coastal) Operational Training Unit RAF (3 OTU) was a training unit of Royal Air Force Coastal Command, operating from 27 November 1940 and disbanding 4 January 1944, being absorbed into No. 6 OTU.

History
The unit formed at RAF Chivenor training crews for various aircraft including Bristol Beauforts, Avro Ansons, Vickers Wellingtons and Armstrong Whitworth Whitleys. On 29 July 1941 the Whitleys and Wellingtons moved to RAF Cranwell and the Beaufort section became No. 5 Operational Training Unit RAF (5 OTU) when it re-formed at Chivenor on 1 August 1941. 3 OTU then moved to RAF Haverfordwest in Pembrokeshire where it was disbanded on 4 January 1944 and absorbed into No. 6 Operational Training Unit RAF (6 OTU).

Airfields used
The main airfield for the unit was RAF Chivenor however a number of different airfields were also used.

 RAF Chivenor.
 RAF Skellingthorpe.
 RAF Bottesford.
 RAF Wellingore.
 RAF Langham.
 RAF Squires Gate.
 RAF Barkston Heath.
 RAF Steeple Morden.
 RAF Templeton.
 RAF Haverfordwest.

See also
List of conversion units of the Royal Air Force

References

Citations

Bibliography

Operational training units of the Royal Air Force
Military units and formations established in 1940
Military units and formations disestablished in 1944